Food Lover's Market is a South African supermarket chain that operates franchised grocery stores and convenience stores in Southern Africa. The company is a member of the Franchise Association of South Africa. As of 2022, there are over 300 stores in South Africa, 2 in Botswana and 3 in Namibia.

History
The company was established in 1993 as a single Fruit & Veg City store in Access Park, a factory outlet complex in the Kenilworth suburb of Cape Town. The outlet was converted from an existing business, The Carrot King, into a Fruit & Veg City store.

Food Lover's Market was founded by brothers Brian and Mike Coppin, whose father had been the Director of OK Bazaars, a retail chain that was acquired by the Shoprite Group in 1997.  When it opened, the company sourced its products directly from farmers and municipal markets, and priced them aggressively, in order to grow in the market whilst competing with existing large retail chains.

In 1995, the brothers were approached by someone wanting to operate a store in Port Elizabeth, and the first franchise store opened. Franchises in East London, Durban, Bloemfontein, and Pretoria followed. The company opened its first store in Johannesburg in 1999.

In 2012, Food Lover's Market expanded its offering to include non-food items, and announced that it would be converting all Fruit & Veg City outlets to its Food Lover's Market brand. In 2014, the company announced it would begin stocking items in a number of grocery categories from British retailer Waitrose.

In 2015, the firm received an R760 million investment from emerging market investor Actis, the firm's CEO Brian Coppin stated that the company was attracted to Actis' history of working with family-owned businesses.

Brands
The company also operates 24-hour convenience stores under the FreshStop brand at over 200 Caltex gas stations across South Africa. It also sells liquor at Market Liquors stores next to select Food Lover's outlets, and operates cafeteria style restaurants at Food Lover's Eatery locations.

Partnerships
Food Lover's Market receives some of its products from South African company Cape Roasters, and supplies its stores through FVC International, a South African import and export company.

South African coffee chain Seattle Coffee Company has outlets at Food Lover's Market and FreshStop stores across the country.

Food Lover's Market has a partnership with South African bank ABSA, whereby ABSA customers can earn cash back by using their debit and credit cards at Food Lover's stores.

References

Food and drink companies based in Cape Town
Retail companies of South Africa
Retail companies established in 1993
South African companies established in 1993